The Wickham Model C Sunbird is a single-seat homebuilt aircraft designed by Boeing engineer James M. Wickham.

Design
The Sunbird is a single-place low wing taildragger made primarily of wood. Power was originally a 1600cc VW, but a Continental C85 was installed later in its life.

Operational history
The Wickham C was the third of six designs by Wickham, which first flew in 1975.

Specifications

See also

References 

Homebuilt aircraft
1970s United States sport aircraft
Low-wing aircraft
Single-engine aircraft
Aircraft first flown in 1975